Saint Mark is a 1448 tempera on canvas painting by Andrea Mantegna. It is now in the Städel Museum in Frankfurt. It is the earliest known work by the artist.

Mantegna was aged 17 in 1448, the year in which he regained his independence after six years in the studio of Francesco Squarcione. He filed a lawsuit against his former master for not paying him for works he had produced under his own name. He also began several commissions, such as the altarpiece for Santa Sofia church in Padua, now destroyed.

It is signed and dated 1448 on a small cartouche in the foreground, inscribed "INCLITA MAGNANIMI VEN... / EVANGELISTA PAX TIBI M[ARC]E / ANDREAE MANTEGNAE PICTORIS LABOR". The use of a cartouche in this way originated in Flemish art and was also used by other Italian artists such as Filippo Lippi.

Bibliography
 Tatjana Pauli, Mantegna, serie Art Book, Leonardo Arte, Milano 2001. 

1448 paintings
Paintings by Andrea Mantegna
Mantegna
Paintings in the collection of the Städel
Books in art